Eye of the Zombie is the fourth solo studio album by American singer/songwriter John Fogerty. Released in September 1986, it was his first album with a backing band, and it includes the Creedence-inspired track "Change in the Weather" as well as "Wasn't That a Woman" and "Soda Pop", his first forays into 60s-70s Motown-sounding funk and R&B. The album was not received well by critics and had lukewarm chart success despite a Grammy nomination for Best Male Rock Vocal in 1987. After the Eye of the Zombie tour in 1986, Fogerty did not perform any material from this album in concerts until 2009, when he played "Change in the Weather" at a few shows. The song was also re-recorded in 2009 for The Blue Ridge Rangers Rides Again and performed live on several late-night TV shows to promote the album.

After Eye of the Zombie, Fogerty would not release another album until Blue Moon Swamp in 1997.

Billboard called the title track a "dark, shivery tale."  Cash Box called it "dirty and gritty" and "rock and roll with a vengeance."

Cash Box called "Change in the Weather" a "swampy, grundgy, soulful groove that could have been a CCR hit." Billboard called it a "swampy down-tempo swayer [with] apocalyptic social predictions."

Track listing
All songs written by John Fogerty

 "Goin' Back Home" – 3:34
 "Eye of the Zombie" – 4:35
 "Headlines" – 4:29
 "Knockin' on Your Door" – 4:18
 "Change in the Weather" – 6:48
 "Violence Is Golden" – 5:20
 "Wasn't That a Woman" – 4:12
 "Soda Pop" – 5:54
 "Sail Away" – 4:41

Personnel
 John Fogerty – vocals, guitar, keyboards
 Alan Pasqua – keyboards (4)
 Neil Stubenhaus – bass guitar
 John Robinson – drums, percussion
 Bobby King, Willie Greene Jr., Terry Evans – background vocals

Chart performance

References

External links
 John Fogerty official site
 Warner Bros. Records

1986 albums
Albums produced by John Fogerty
John Fogerty albums
Warner Records albums